Tom Griffin Sluby (born February 18, 1962) is an American former professional basketball player. He was a 6'4" (1.93 m) and 200 lb (91 kg) shooting guard and played collegiately at the University of Notre Dame from 1980–1984.

Sluby was made the 17th pick in the second round of the 1984 NBA Draft by the Dallas Mavericks and played 31 games with them in the 1984-85 season, in which he averaged 2.4 points, 0.4 rebounds and 0.5 assists per game.

External links
NBA stats @ basketballreference.com
Tom Sluby profile @ thedraftreview.com

1962 births
Living people
20th-century African-American sportspeople
21st-century African-American people
African-American basketball players
American men's basketball players
Basketball players from Washington, D.C.
Dallas Mavericks draft picks
Dallas Mavericks players
Gonzaga College High School alumni
Notre Dame Fighting Irish men's basketball players
Parade High School All-Americans (boys' basketball)
Shooting guards